Antoine-Marie Coupart (13 June 1780 – 19 October 1864) was an early 19th-century French playwright and chansonnier, as well as a dramaturge at the Théâtre du Palais Royal (1831–1864).

Biography 
At first an employee in the administration of military transport in Paris and Liège (1796–1798), he joined then the office of newspapers and theaters and the Ministry of Police where he became deputy chief in 1813. He worked with the same title at the Ministry of the interior in 1820 and became head of that office in 1824. After he was put on retirement in 1829, he worked as secretary general of the Paris Opera.

From 1822 to 1836, he was responsible for the publication of the Almanach des spectacles (twelve volumes).

His plays were presented at the Théâtre des Variétés and at the Théâtre de l'Ambigu-Comique in Paris.

Works 
1803: Lucile ou l'amant à l'épreuve, comedy in 1 act and in prose
1804: Toujours le même, vaudeville in 1 act, with Joseph Servières
1804: Les trois n'en font qu'un, vaudeville in 1 act, with Servières
1805: Les Nouvelles métamorphoses, vaudeville in 1 act and in prose, with Servières
1814: Vive la paix ! ou le Retour au village, impromptu in 1 act, mingled with songs and danses, with E. F. Varez
1815: Voilà notre bouquet ! ou le Cabinet littéraire, impromptu-vaudeville in 1 act, with Varez
1819: Le Passe-partout, comédie-vaudeville in 1 act, with Jean-Antoine-Marie Monperlier
1820: Levez la toile !, pièce épisodique in 1 act and in vaudevilles, with Jacquelin
1821: Le Baptême, ou la Double fête, vaudeville in 1 act
1822: Un trait de bienfaisance, ou la Fête d'un bon maire, à-propos in 1 act mingled with couplets, with Varez
1823: L'Aubergiste malgré lui, comédie proverbe, with Nicolas Brazier and Théodore Nézel 
1823: Le Passage militaire, ou la Désertion par honneur, entertainment in 1 act, with Jacquelin
1823: Fête à la halle ! ou le Retour de nos braves, tableau épisodique in 1 act, with Jacquelin
1824: La fête d'automne, tableau villageois in 1 act, with Jacquelin and Varez
1824: Le Retour d'un brave, vaudeville in 1 act, with Jacquelin and Varez
1825: L'Entrée à Reims, entertainment in 1 act, with Jacques-André Jacquelin and Armand Joseph Overnay
1825: Le Petit postillon de Fimes, ou Deux fêtes pour une, à propos historique in 1 act, with Jacquelin
1826: Le Fils de l'invalide, one-act play, mingled with couplets, with Jacquelin and Varez
1829: La comédie au château, one-act play mingled with couplets, with Jacquelin and Varez
1830: Chansons d'un employé mis à la retraite
undated: Couplets chantés le 22 juillet 1827, à Soisy-sous-Étiolles, à l'occasion de la fête de Marguerite G
undated: Souvenir du 11 juin 1842
1854: Couplets d'inauguration de la société de la Chopinette, fondée par les artistes du théâtre du Palais-Royal, chantés le 6 janvier 1855

Bibliography 
 François-Joseph Fétis, Biographie universelle des musiciens, vol.3-4, 1837, (p. 205) (Read online) 
 Gustave Vapereau, L'année littéraire et dramatique, 1865, (p. 374)
 Gustave Vapereau, Dictionnaire universel des contemporains, 1865, (p. 435) (Read online) 
 Ludovic Lalanne, Dictionnaire historique de la France, 1872, (p. 596) (Read online)

External links 
 Antoine-Marie Coupart on data.bnf.fr

19th-century French dramatists and playwrights
French chansonniers
1780 births
Writers from Paris
1864 deaths